Jushqan (also Romanized as Jūshqān) is a village in Tabar Rural District, Jolgeh Shoqan District, Jajrom County, North Khorasan Province, Iran. At the 2006 census, its population was 561, in 152 families.

References 

Populated places in Jajrom County